Mikko Strömberg (born March 5, 1979) is a Finnish former professional ice hockey goaltender. He last played with the HC Val Pusteria Wolves in Serie A during the 2011–12 season.

External links
 
 
 http://www.jokerit.com/index.php?id=2&pid=80 (in Finnish)

1979 births
Living people
Finnish ice hockey goaltenders
HC TWK Innsbruck players
HIFK (ice hockey) players
HPK players
Jokerit players
Oulun Kärpät players
Mikkelin Jukurit players
HC Pustertal Wölfe players
SaiPa players
Ice hockey people from Helsinki